The Stuttgart Rebels is an ice hockey team based in Stuttgart, Germany. They play in the Regionalliga, the fourth-highest level of ice hockey in Germany, in the Süd-West Division.

Arena
The team plays at the 3,000-seat Eiswelt Stuttgart.

History
Since 1998 Stuttgart Rebels have played in the fourth tier of hockey in Germany every season except from 2003 to 2006 when they played in the Oberliga, the third division. From 1998 to 2000 the team was known as the Stuttgarter Eishockey-Club e.V. From 2000 to 2006 the team used the name Stuttgart Wizards before rebranding to the current name of Stuttgart Rebels prior to the 2006–2007 season.

Honours
Stuttgart Rebels have been champions of the Regionalliga Süd-West three times and 1-time champion of the Landesliga Baden-Württemberg.
Regionalliga Süd-West Champions (3): 2006/07, 2009/10, 2010/11
Landesliga Baden-Württemberg Champions (1): 2008/09

References

External links
Official website
Elite Prospects profile
Euro Hockey profile

Ice hockey teams in Germany
Ice hockey teams in Baden-Württemberg
Ice hockey clubs established in 1997
Sport in Stuttgart
1997 establishments in Germany